Samberigi may refer to:

Samberigi, Papua New Guinea, a town in the Southern Highlands of Papua New Guinea; see List of cities and towns in Papua New Guinea
Samberigi Airport
Samberigi language